Constance Cochrane (1888-1962), was an American painter. She was an original member of the Philadelphia Ten.

Biography
Cochrane was born in 1888 at the United States Navy Yard in Pensacola, Florida. She attended the Philadelphia School of Design, studying under Elliott Daingerfield, and Henry B. Snell. After completing her studies Brooks set up a studio in Philadelphia.

Between 1921 and 1927 Cochrane lectured at the Philadelphia School of Design. She was an original member of the Philadelphia Ten. She was also a member of the Philadelphia Art Alliance and the National Association of Women Artists.

Coming from a naval family, Brooks was known for her seascapes. In 1921 she began visiting Monhegan, Maine, eventually building a studio there.

Cochrane died in 1962.

References

1888 births 
1962 deaths
20th-century American women artists
Philadelphia School of Design for Women alumni